The Awakening is Send More Paramedics's third full-length album. It was released in 2006 on In At The Deep End Records.

Track listing
 "Everything Is Not Under Control" - 2:57
 "Follow Your Programming" - 1:39
 "Sever" - 3:16
 "Blood Fever" - 2:29
 "Twilight of the Flies" - 2:29
 "Disaster Song" - 1:48
 "This Crowd Is Crushing Me" - 2:54
 "Flail of God" - 3:38
 "Virulence" - 2:49
 "Scapegoat" - 2:57
 "The Unclean" - 2:02
 "Anthropophagi" - 2:33
 "Vital Signs" - 2:17
 "I Am Every Dead Thing" - 3:23
 "Transmission" - 3:17

A video for the song "Blood Fever" was released by Send More Paramedics

The song "Twilight of the Flies" was featured on a Kerrang! compilation album entitled "New Blood".

External links

2006 albums
Send More Paramedics albums